Rico Peter (born 13 September 1983) is a Swiss bobsledder.

Peter competed at the 2014 Winter Olympics for Switzerland. He teamed with brakeman Juerg Egger in the Switzerland-2 sled in the two-man event, finishing tenth.

As of April 2014, his best showing at the World Championships is 6th, in 2013 four-man event.

Peter made his World Cup debut in December 2011. As of April 2014, his best finish is 5th, in 2013-14 at Konigssee.

References

1983 births
Living people
Olympic bobsledders of Switzerland
Bobsledders at the 2014 Winter Olympics
Bobsledders at the 2018 Winter Olympics
Swiss male bobsledders
Sportspeople from the canton of Lucerne